Sumawali Assembly constituency is one of the 230 Vidhan Sabha (Legislative Assembly) constituencies of Madhya Pradesh state in central India. This constituency came into existence in 1976, following the delimitation of the legislative assembly constituencies.

Sumawali (constituency number 5) is one of the six Vidhan Sabha constituencies located in Morena district. This constituency covers parts of Joura and Morena tehsils.

Sumawali is part of Morena Lok Sabha constituency.

Members of Legislative Assembly
 1977: Jahar Singh, Janata Party
 1980: Yogender Singh, Bharatiya Janata Party 
 1985: Kirat Ram Singh Kansana, Indian National Congress
 1990: Gajraj Singh Sikarwar, Janata Dal
 1993:  Adal Singh Kansana, Bahujan Samaj Party
 1998: Adal Singh Kansana, Bahujan Samaj Party
 2003: Gajraj Singh Sikarwar, Bharatiya Janata Party
 2008: Adal Singh Kansana, Indian National Congress
 2013: Satya Pal Singh, Bhartiya Janta Party
2018: Adal Singh Kansana, Indian National Congress
 2020 (By Polls): Ajab Singh Kushwah, Indian National Congress

See also
 Morena district

References

Morena district
Assembly constituencies of Madhya Pradesh